The 1888 Crescent Athletic Club football team was an American football team that represented the Crescent Athletic Club in the American Football Union (AFU) during the 1888 college football season. The team compiled a 6–2 record (6–0 against AFU opponents), won the AFU championship, and played its home games at Crescent Athletic Club grounds in Brooklyn.

Schedule

Consolidated team schedule
The consolidated team of the Crescent Athletic Club was also known as the Brooklyn Football Club, and played as such in their contests against the Alerts of New York on October 20 and the October 27 match against Flushing Athletic Club.

References

Crescent Athletic Club
Crescent Athletic Club football seasons
Crescent Athletic Club football